The 17th Dáil was elected at the 1961 general election on 4 October 1961 and met on 11 October 1961. The members of Dáil Éireann, the house of representatives of the Oireachtas (legislature) of Ireland, are known as TDs. On 18 March 1965 President Éamon de Valera dissolved the Dáil on the request of Taoiseach Seán Lemass. The 17th Dáil lasted  days.

Composition of the 17th Dáil

Fianna Fáil, denoted with a bullet, formed the 10th Government of Ireland led by Seán Lemass as Taoiseach.

Graphical representation
This is a graphical comparison of party strengths in the 17th Dáil from October 1961. This was not the official seating plan.

Ceann Comhairle
On the meeting of the Dáil, Patrick Hogan (Lab), who had served as Ceann Comhairle since 1951, was proposed by Seán Lemass (FF) and seconded by James Dillon (FG) for the position. His election was approved without a vote.

TDs by constituency
The list of the 144 TDs elected, is given in alphabetical order by Dáil constituency.

Changes

See also
Members of the 10th Seanad

Notes

References

External links
Houses of the Oireachtas: Debates: 17th Dáil

 
17
17th Dáil